Ottawa Basilica may refer to:
 St. Patrick's Basilica (Ottawa)
 Notre-Dame Cathedral Basilica (Ottawa)